Colonel Sir Henry Davies Foster MacGeagh  (21 October 1883 – 29 December 1962) was a British judge, who served as Judge Advocate General of the Armed Forces. He was admitted to the Middle Temple on 13 January 1903 and was Called to the Bar on 27 June 1906. He was later Called to the Bench on 29 January 1931.

References 

 Oxford Dictionary of National Biography, G. R. Rubin, ‘MacGeagh, Sir Henry Davies Foster (1883–1962)’, first published 2004; online edn, Jan 2008, 1206 words 
 ‘MacGEAGH, Colonel Sir Henry Davies Foster’, Who Was Who, A & C Black, 1920–2008; online edn, Oxford University Press, Dec 2007 accessed 20 April 2012

20th-century English judges
Knights Grand Cross of the Royal Victorian Order
Knights Commander of the Order of the Bath
Knights Commander of the Order of the British Empire
1883 births
1962 deaths
War Office personnel in World War II